Jim Forsythe (born October 1, 1968) is a former Republican member of the New Hampshire Senate, having represented the 4th District from 2010 to 2012. Forsythe moved to Strafford, New Hampshire, and became involved in politics after a career in the US Air Force.

On June 8, 2011, Forsythe was announced as New Hampshire Campaign Chairman for the presidential campaign of Congressman Ron Paul.

On January 5, 2012, Forsythe announced that he would not run for re-election in 2012.

References

Republican Party New Hampshire state senators
People from Strafford, New Hampshire
1968 births
Living people